Winfield Forrest Prime (November 22, 1860 – September 10, 1926) was an American lawyer and politician who twice served as a member of the Massachusetts House of Representatives.

Early life
Prime was born in Charlestown, Massachusetts to Oliver and Emma F. (Kennard) Prime on November 22, 1860.

Family life
Prime married Mary A. Fontaine on May 19, 1891.  They had one child, a son, Selwyn Forrest Prime.

Massachusetts House of Representatives
Prime served as a member of the Massachusetts House of Representatives from two different districts.

1890 legislative session
In 1890, Prime represented Ward 4 of the Charlestown district of Boston, Massachusetts, in the Massachusetts House.  During the 1890 session Prime served on the committee  on Probate and Insolvency.

1913-1914 legislative sessions
Prime later was the representative of the twenty seventh Middlesex District serving from 1913 and 1914.  Prime served on the committee on Probate and Insolvency in 1913, and as a member of the Judiciary Committee in 1914.

See also
 1915 Massachusetts legislature

References

 

Boston University School of Law alumni
Massachusetts lawyers
Republican Party members of the Massachusetts House of Representatives
People from Winchester, Massachusetts
1860 births
1926 deaths
19th-century American lawyers